Grew Peak is a peak over  high, one of several named peaks on the Mount Murphy massif in Marie Byrd Land, Antarctica. The feature is located on the northeast spur of the massif, between Benedict Peak and the loftier summit peaks. It was mapped by the United States Geological Survey from surveys and U.S. Navy air photos, 1959–66, and was named by the Advisory Committee on Antarctic Names for Edward Grew, a U.S. Exchange Scientist to the Soviet Molodyozhnaya Station in 1973.

References

Mountains of Marie Byrd Land